Caregiver is a 2008 Filipino drama film. The film stars Sharon Cuneta portraying the role of Sarah, a mother who left her son in the Philippines and also a teacher who relinquished her profession in lieu of care giving in London, in hopes of augmenting her salary. Chito S. Roño directed the film and Chris Martinez wrote its screenplay.

Plot summary
Sarah Gonzales, a grade school teacher of English, joins the 150,000 OFWs working in the United Kingdom to support her husband, Teddy Gonzales, in making a better living for their family. More than just a chronicle of the Filipino experience working as nurses and caregivers in the U.K., this story also charts Sarah's journey of self-discovery from a submissive wife who makes sacrifices for her husband's aspirations to an empowered woman who finds dignity and pride in a humbling job as a caregiver in London.

The story begins as Sarah says goodbye to her familiar world. After finishing an arduous course in caregiving, she bids farewell to the Grade 5 classroom where she teaches English. She buys a winter coat for her son Paulo and promises he will use it once she can afford to bring him to London. In typical Pinoy fashion, she shares tearful goodbyes with her family at the airport when she finally leaves for the United Kingdom.

Sarah arrives in London. At their apartment, she and Teddy share a passionate reunion. In a honeymoon mood, he takes her to the beautiful sights around London. While shopping at a neighborhood store, Sarah meets Sean, a spunky Filipino boy, as he tries to shoplift chocolate bars.

After the initial fleeting period of excitement, she experiences the hard challenges every Filipino caregiver faces every day: cold weather, dirty work and difficult patients.

Meanwhile, Teddy also struggles with the daily grind in the hospital where he works. He is stressed and drinks often because he has failed the nursing test twice.

Despite the difficulty of adjusting to London life, however, Sarah faithfully stands by her Teddy. She tries to make the most of the situation by doing her best at work and earns the respect of Mr. Morgan, a wealthy old man. Teddy is oblivious to her success, however, as he is absorbed in his own problems with work. Sarah finds solace in her friendship with Mr. Morgan and his son David, who seems to appreciate her more than Teddy does, and with Sean, who eases her longing for her own son.

Tension rises between Sarah and Teddy as the stress of London life takes its toll on their marriage. Because of mounting conflict both at work and home, Teddy decides to give up. He tells Sarah that they are going back to the Philippines.

Sarah finds it very hard to accept Teddy's decision. She knows that staying in London is the best thing for their family, because returning to the Philippines would only mean going back to the same problems they had before.

When Mr. Morgan dies, Sarah decides to go back to the Philippines with Teddy. While packing her bags, she notices the book Mr. Morgan gave her, and reads his letter describing how lucky her husband and son are to have her and to remind her that she is a person who should do things that make her feel alive. And he wishes her to be happy and without regret.

On the way to the airport, Teddy shows his nasty attitude again and makes Sarah realize that she can leave him and is her own person. She walks out on him and rides a taxi back to London. The story ends with Sarah reunited with her son Paulo and Sean enjoying London's Buckingham Palace.

Cast
 Sharon Cuneta as Sarah Gonzales
 John Estrada as Theodore "Teddy" Gonzales
 John Manalo as Paulo "Pau" Gonzales
 Rica Peralejo as Karen
 Jhong Hilario as Joseph
 Jim Muldoon as Nursing Home Doctor
 Saul Reichlin as William Morgan
 Matthew Rutherford as David Morgan
 Claire Jeater as Margaret Morgan
 Makisig Morales as Sean
 Mickey Ferriols as Julia
 Julia Montes as Gemma
 Lotlot De Leon as Betty
 Marita Zobel as Nemie
 Anita Linda† as Lola Miling
 Cheska Billiones as Sarah's student
 Consuelo Bilcliffe as Ditas

Production
The film is based on real-life stories of Filipino caregivers abroad. Director Roño searched for stories of their lives abroad and personally talked to some who shared their experiences. Roño has friends who work as caregivers; their real-life scenarios were directly depicted in the film.
The cast includes British actors namely: Saul Reichlin, Matthew Rutherford, and Claire Jeater.

The rest of the film was shot in Roosevelt College Rodriguez. The scenes here include the part where Sarah was still studying as a caregiver student.

Release
Caregiver is released under Star Cinema, which marks the company's fifteenth year in service. The year 2008 also marks Cuneta's 30th  anniversary in the industry, and the film serves as offering to fans.

The film was also released in international cinemas. Caregiver had its premiere in Alex Theatre in Glendale, California on May 31, 2008. Many Filipino caregivers working far from California travelled in to watch the film. It was released in late June and early July 2008 to several Middle East countries, including Qatar and Dubai.

Awards

References

External links
 
 Caregiver ABS-CBN Global Movies

2008 films
Philippine drama films
Films shot in London
Star Cinema films
2000s Tagalog-language films
Films set in the Philippines
Films directed by Chito S. Roño
2000s English-language films